Tillandsia cardenasii is a species in the genus Tillandsia. This species is endemic to Bolivia.

References

cardenasii
Flora of Bolivia